The 7D is an American animated television series produced by Disney Television Animation. It premiered on July 7, 2014 and ended on November 5, 2016 and airs on Disney XD worldwide (Disney Channel and Disney Junior in some countries). It is a re-imagining of the title characters from the 1937 film Snow White and the Seven Dwarfs by Walt Disney Animation Studios, and their adventures prior to the introduction of Snow White. The first season consisted of 24 episodes. On December 2, 2014, the series was renewed for a second season. On April 25, 2016, it was announced that The 7D would not continue after the second season.

Series overview

Episodes

Season 1 (2014–15)

Season 2 (2016)

Notes

References

Lists of American children's animated television series episodes
Lists of Disney Channel television series episodes
Seven Dwarfs
Snow White (franchise)